"Lighthearted" is a song by New Zealand musician, Jenny Morris. It was released in October 1987 the fourth and final single from her debut studio album, Body and Soul (1987).

Track listings
 CD Single/ 7"  (WEA – 7-258170)
 "Lighthearted" – 4:25
 "Are You Ready?" – 4:48

Charts

Weekly charts

References

1987 songs
1987 singles
Jenny Morris (musician) songs